Walter Arnott (12 May 1861 – 18 May 1931), sometimes known as Wattie Arnott, was a Scottish footballer who played for Queen's Park and the Scotland national team.

Football career
Born in Pollokshields (then in Renfrew County but in the parish of Govan), Arnott joined Queen's Park from Pollokshields Athletic in 1882 as a replacement for Andrew Watson and remained with the Glasgow club until 1893. However, as an amateur he was free to play for other clubs, including Kilmarnock, Newcastle West End, Notts County, Third Lanark and Corinthian. He also coached the young players at Queen's Park, initially retiring from playing in 1888 before being persuaded to return.

At Queen's Park, he won the Scottish Cup three times in 1884, 1886 and 1890, gaining additional medals in the Glasgow Cup and Glasgow Merchants Charity Cup, typically partnered by Andrew Holm and later by Bob Smellie. He also won FA Cup runners-up medals in 1884 and 1885. He switched to St Bernard's on a permanent basis (making all but one of his Scottish Football League appearances with the Edinburgh club) following a dispute with Queen's Park regarding being overlooked for the later stages of the 1892–93 Scottish Cup, but did not play for Belfast side Linfield as reported in some sources – this player, who won an Irish Cup medal, was Willie Arnott, brother of Wattie.

Arnott was capped 14 times by Scotland between 1883 and 1893. He appeared in ten consecutive matches against England, a Scottish record, although it has been noted that the results of those matches were not always in Scotland's favour, with the style of play used by Queen's Park differing from that used by the likes of Renton and Celtic, and some defensive partnerships from the different 'schools' being ineffective. The SFA honoured Arnott by presenting him with a special International Cap to commemorate his achievement – this is now displayed at the Scottish Football Museum.

Other sports
Arnott was also a noted bowls, cricket, and tennis player. He was also an avid yachtsman. He was also Secretary of the Crossmyloof Curling Club from 1912 to 1931.

See also
List of Scotland national football team captains

References

External links

1861 births
1931 deaths
19th-century Scottish people
Footballers from Glasgow
Queen's Park F.C. players
Scotland international footballers
Scottish footballers
Notts County F.C. players
St Bernard's F.C. players
Pollokshields Athletic F.C. players
Scottish Football League players
Kilmarnock F.C. players
Third Lanark A.C. players
Corinthian F.C. players
Queen's Park F.C. non-playing staff
Association football fullbacks
FA Cup Final players